Jebchit is a village in the Nabatieh Governorate region of southern Lebanon located north of the Litani River.

History
In 1596, it was named as a village,  Jibsid, in the Ottoman nahiya (subdistrict) of Sagif under the liwa' (district) of Safad, with a population of 39 households and 10 bachelors, all Muslim. The villagers paid a fixed tax-rate of 25%  on agricultural products, such as wheat, barley, olive trees, fruit trees, goats, beehives and "Occasional revenues"; a total of 5,040 akçe.

In 1875 Victor Guérin found here a village of 400 Metualis, and a Wali, named Nabi Seth.

On the night of 27/28 July 1989 Israeli commandos abducted the Hizbullah leader Sheikh Abdel Karim Obeid and two of his aides from his home in Jibchit. The operation was planned by the then Minister of Defence Yitzhak Rabin. Hizbullah responded by announcing the execution of Colonel Higgins a senior American officer working with UNIFIL who had been kidnapped in February 1988.

In 1993, during a week-long attack by Israel on Lebanon; "an Israeli Army spokesperson said that “70 percent of the village of Jibshit is totally destroyed, its inhabitants will not recognize it.”  The goal is “to wipe the villages from the face of the earth,” a senior officer added."

See also
Abdel Karim Obeid
Ragheb Harb

References

Bibliography

External links
Official Website : www.jebchit.com
Jibchit, Localiban 

Populated places in Nabatieh District
Shia Muslim communities in Lebanon